Schmuck may refer to:

 Schmuck (pejorative), a common pejorative of Yiddish origin 
 Schmuck (surname), a surname of German origin
 Schmuck v. United States, a criminal case decided by the U.S. Supreme Court in 1989.